Javanese traditional house refers to the traditional vernacular houses of Javanese people in the island of Java, Indonesia.

See also 

 Indonesian architecture
 Rumah adat
 Kraton (Indonesia)
 List of mosques in Indonesia
 Dutch Indies country houses
 Kotagede

References

Works cited

Rumah adat
Javanese culture
House types